is a lake in Miyakonojō and Takaharu in Miyazaki Prefecture, Japan.

Geography and geology
The height above sea level is 305 m, the depth 93.5 meters, the deepest in Japan as the crater lake. There is no outflow of water from the lake. The lake is encircled by forests, and there is a park called Miike Yacho(Birds) no Mori and a camp site. Waterfowls such as mandarin ducks, teals, spectakled teals are seen. The lake was created by a crater resulting from a magma vapor eruption about 4200 years ago. Flatstones are seen in the layers of ground near by, called Miike floatstones or Miike bora.

History
Along the border of the lake, there was mythologically 7 ports, and Emperor Jinmu was said to play in the neighborhood of one of the ports, Oojikou. Seiku shonin, a holy priest who was said to build Kirishima Higashi Shrine trained himself homa. After the WW2, weapons and tanks were thrown into the lake.

Footnotes

Lakes of Japan
Landforms of Miyazaki Prefecture